Dan McKay Broadhead (16 November 1891 – 1978) was a Scottish amateur football wing half who played in the Scottish League for Queen's Park.

Personal life 
As of 1911, Broadhead was a student teacher. He served as a private in the Highland Light Infantry during the First World War.

Career statistics

References

1891 births
1978 deaths
Scottish footballers
Scottish Football League players
British Army personnel of World War I
Highland Light Infantry soldiers
People from Peebles
Association football wing halves
Queen's Park F.C. players
Date of death missing